Harry Baker is a British spoken word artist, author and poet.

Early life 
Born in Ealing in 1992, Harry Baker grew up as part of a Christian community in west London. After switching from studying medicine to allow his pursuit of poetry, Baker studied mathematics with German at Bristol University.

Career

2012 to present 
Baker has won the London and UK Slam Poetry Championships. In 2012, he won the World Slam Poetry Competition, becoming the youngest ever winner.

In 2014 Baker began performing as a speaker for TED. His talk ‘A love poem for lonely prime numbers’ has over 2 million views. A collection of his own poetry, The Sunshine Kid, was published in 2015 by Burning Eye Books. Baker received major national airplay on the BBC in 2015 when he wrote and performed a poem for Simon Mayo's Radio 2 show. On Boxing Day 2016, he performed a Christmas Meditation on BBC Radio 4. He occasionally performs as a battle rapper, featuring on Don't Flop. Together with the jazz guitarist Chris Read, he is half of "Harry and Chris", who have performed on The Russell Howard Hour television programme.

References

English male poets
Year of birth missing (living people)
Living people
21st-century English poets
Alumni of the University of Bristol
English spoken word artists
People from Ealing
Writers from London
21st-century English male writers